Laprida is a town in Buenos Aires Province, Argentina. It is the administrative centre for Laprida Partido.

Attractions
Museo Archivo Histórico Hugo H. Diez (Hugo Diez Museum & Historical archive)
Laguna El Paraíso, lake, located 4 km from the city, a popular summer resorts on the region.

External links

 Municipal website

Populated places in Buenos Aires Province
Populated places established in 1889